Bruce Maurice Racine (born August 9, 1966) is a Canadian former professional hockey goaltender who played in the NHL with the St. Louis Blues.

Racine was drafted in the third round, 58th overall by the Pittsburgh Penguins. Bruce played his youth hockey in the Ottawa Valley and spent one season in the CJHL with the Hawkesbury Hawks before joining Northeastern University where he was a two-time All-American, He set school records for games played, minutes played and wins leading the Huskies to Beanpot Championships in 1985 and 1988 and a Hockey East Championship in 1988.

After his collegiate career, he signed with Pittsburgh. Racine played with the Penguins farm team the Muskegon Lumberjacks of the IHL, for parts of five seasons (with a break as the starting goaltender for the Albany Choppers). In the 1988/89 season with the Lumberjacks he led the IHL in wins and shutouts and was named to the league's First All-Star team. In 1991 Racine was recalled to Pittsburgh for the playoffs and dressed for four playoff games. Racine was included in the Stanley Cup team picture, and given a Stanley Cup ring. 
Racine then played under contract for the Toronto Maple Leafs in the AHL for two seasons with the St. John's Maple Leafs.

Racine finally got his chance to play in an NHL game when he signed as a free agent with the St. Louis Blues in 1995. In the 1995/1996 season he started the year in the minors with the Peoria Rivermen but eventually got the call to back up Grant Fuhr. That year Fuhr set a record by playing in 79 games but coach Mike Keenan often pulled Fuhr during games, allowing Racine to play in 11 games, posting a 0–3–0 record and a 3.13 GAA. Racine also played in one playoff game after Fuhr was sidelined with an injury.

Racine played another five years in the IHL with the San Antonio Dragons, Fort Wayne Komets, being named the team's MVP both seasons with Fort Wayne and setting franchise marks for goaltending. Racine spent one season under contract with the San Jose Sharks playing for the IHL Kansas City Blades. He finished his career playing one season for Lukko Rauma had a brief stint with Metallurg Novokuznetsk and 2 seasons for Ilves Tampere in Finland.  He retired after the 2002/2003 season.

After retirement, he was an assistant coach at Northeastern University in the 2004/2005 season, and now lives in the St. Louis area, where he operates Racine Goalie Academy.

Awards and honors

References

External links

 Racine Goalie Academy

1966 births
AHCA Division I men's ice hockey All-Americans
Albany Choppers players
Canadian expatriate ice hockey players in Finland
Canadian ice hockey goaltenders
Cleveland Lumberjacks players
Fort Wayne Komets players
Ice hockey people from Ontario
Ilves players
Kansas City Blades players
Living people
Lukko players
Muskegon Lumberjacks players
Northeastern Huskies men's ice hockey players
Peoria Rivermen (IHL) players
Pittsburgh Penguins draft picks
San Antonio Dragons players
Sportspeople from Cornwall, Ontario
St. John's Maple Leafs players
St. Louis Blues players
Stanley Cup champions